My Name Is Luca is the debut studio album by Swiss recording artist Luca Hänni, the winner of the ninth season of Deutschland Sucht Den Superstar, the German version of American Idol. It was released by Universal Music on 18 May 2012 in German-speaking Europe. Entirely produced by DSDS judge Dieter Bohlen, the album contains two cover versions which were already performed by Hänni during the DSDS shows, including "The A Team" by Ed Sheeran and "Baby" by Justin Bieber.

Track listing

Charts

Weekly charts

Year-end charts

Certifications

References

External links
 

2012 debut albums
Luca Hänni albums